The 31st RTHK Top 10 Gold Songs Awards was held on January 18, 2009 for the 2008 music season.

Top 10 song awards
The top 10 songs (十大中文金曲) of 2008 are as follows.

Other awards

References
 RTHK top 10 gold song awards 2008

RTHK Top 10 Gold Songs Awards
2009 in Hong Kong
2009 music awards